Bismark is a town in the Stendal district, in the historic Altmark region, which is located in the northern part of the state of Saxony-Anhalt, Germany.

In the early 12th century, the area then under the rule of Albert the Bear was settled with peasants migrating from the Low Countries. The town's name is derived from the nearby river Biese (after  meaning rush plants); though it may also refer to the bishop's march, a possession of the Havelberg bishops mentioned in a 1209 deed issued by the Ascanian margrave Albert II. With the Altmark, Bismark was part of the Margraviate of Brandenburg until it was adjudicated to the Prussian Province of Saxony after the 1815 Congress of Vienna.

One Herbordus of Bismarck was mentioned holding the office of a Schultheiß in Stendal about 1270. His descendant Otto von Bismarck received the honorary citizenship of Bismark in 1895.

At an administrative reform that became effective on 1 January 2010, the town of Bismark absorbed the former municipalities of Badingen, Berkau, Büste, Dobberkau, Garlipp, Grassau, Hohenwulsch, Holzhausen, Käthen, Kläden, Könnigde, Kremkau, Meßdorf, Querstedt, Schäplitz, Schernikau, Schorstedt and Steinfeld. Schinne was absorbed on 1 September 2010. These 19 former municipalities and Bismark proper, that had previously co-operated in the  Verwaltungsgemeinschaft Bismark/Kläden, now form the 20 Ortschaften (municipal divisions) of the town.

Notable persons

 Elise Hampel, born Lemme (1903-1943); resistance fighter, executed on April 8, 1943 with her husband Otto Hampel in Berlin-Plötzensee.

References

 
Towns in Saxony-Anhalt
Stendal (district)